Soleyman Tappeh (also Romanized as Soleymān Tappeh) is a village in Anjirabad Rural District, in the Central District of Gorgan County, Golestan Province, Iran. At the 2006 census, its population was 319, in 73 families.

References 

Populated places in Gorgan County